Acroperus is a genus of crustaceans in the family Chydoridae.

Species 

 Acroperus alonoides Hudendorff, 1876
 Acroperus angustatus G.O. Sars, 1863
 Acroperus aureolata (Doolitle, 1913)
 Acroperus avirostris Henry, 1919
 Acroperus dispar Keilhack, 1908
 Acroperus elongatus (G.O. Sars, 1862)
 Acroperus harpae (Baird, 1834)
 Acroperus maduensis Keilhack, 1905
 Acroperus neglectus Lilljeborg, 1901
 Acroperus sinuatus Henry, 1919
 Acroperus tupinamba Sinev & Elmoor-Loureiro, 2010

References 

Cladocera
Crustaceans described in 2010